Nikolajs Švedrēvics (January 18, 1891 – July 7, 1937) was a Latvian track and field athlete who competed for the Russian Empire in the 1912 Summer Olympics, where he finished 20th in the javelin throw competition. He was born in Riga, Russian Empire.

References

External links
 profile

1891 births
1937 deaths
Athletes from Riga
People from the Governorate of Livonia
Latvian male javelin throwers
Olympic competitors for the Russian Empire
Athletes (track and field) at the 1912 Summer Olympics